Pericle Pagliani (2 February 1883 - 4 October 1932) was an Italian long-distance runner who competed in the  men's 5 miles and men's 3 miles team race at the 1908 Summer Olympics.

Biography
He was the most famous Italian podist in the early twentieth century, the idol of the youngest Dorando Pietri, who decided to seriously engage in racing competitions when he battled him in a racing competition that took place in 1904 in his Carpi hometown.

Achievements

National titles
He won five national championships at individual senior level.

Italian Athletics Championships
5000 metres: 1908
Half marathon: 1906, 1910
Cross country: 1908, 1909

References

External links
 
 Pericle Pagliani page at LazioWiki

1880s births
1932 deaths
Athletes (track and field) at the 1908 Summer Olympics
Italian male long-distance runners
Italian male cross country runners
Italian male marathon runners
Olympic athletes of Italy